Miguel de los Santos Serra y Sucarrats (11 January 1868 - 9 August 1936) was a Spanish prelate of the Roman Catholic church and Bishop of Sergorbe.

Biography
Serra was born on the 11 January 1868 in Olot in Girona Spain. He studied for the priesthood and was ordained on 16 April 1892. On the 14 December 1922, Pope Pius XI named him bishop of the Diocese of Canarias - part of the Canary Islands and took office on 7 October 1923. He was translated to the diocese of Sergorbe 16 January 1936.

Death
Serra, along with other religious including his brother, was shot dead during the persecution of religious in Spain on 9 August 1936.

See also
 Diocese of Canarias
 Dicese of Sergorbe

References

Further reading
 González Rodríguez, María Encarnación (2012). The twelve martyred bishops of the 20th century in Spain . 

Spanish Roman Catholic bishops
Bishops appointed by Pope Pius XI
1868 births
1936 deaths